Samut Prakan City Football Club is a Thai football club based in Samut Prakan, Thailand. It was founded in 2018, following Pattaya United's owner decided to change club name and relocated it to Samut Prakan.

History

Foundation

The club was founded in the end of season 2018 after Tanet Phanichewa Pattaya United's owner decided to change club name to Samut Prakan City and relocated it to Samut Prakan Province. The club will be participate for their first season in the 2019 Thai League 1.

Beginnings in the Thai League 1 and Japanese-Thai connection
Prior to the 2019 season,  The club appointed Tetsuya Murayama as the club first Director of football, the work of Tetsuya Murayama in coordination with Coach Surapong Kongthep in the first season of the club in Thai league 1, the club performed quite well and finished in 6th place.

The club appointed Masatada Ishii as manager ahead of the 2020–21 Thai League 1 season by releasing Ibson Melo, Kim Pyung-rae, Baworn Tapla, Phumin Kaewta and Woranat Thongkruea. The club signing Tatsuya Sakai from Montedio Yamagata, Yuto Ono from FC Gifu and brazilian striker Pedro Júnior.

The 2020–21 Thai League 1 season began with 1–1 draw against Chiangrai United on 14 February 2020, followed up by three match lose. The first win in the league came at the 5th matchday, winning 1–0 against Rayong at the Samut Prakarn SAT Stadium on 13 September 2020. After the 10th matchday, the club stood at 12th place in the league.

After a series of disappointing results, The club has won 3 match in a row, winning 1–3 against Buriram United at the Chang Arena, winning Chonburi and Trat and the club climbed to 6th place after the first half of the season (Round 15). The success compared to a relatively smaller team size than the other teams in the league, however, was followed by a win against one of the wealthiest club in the Thai League Port 6–3 on 27 December 2020.

Samut Prakan City advanced to the third round of the Thai FA Cup, being eliminated after losing 1–0 to Muangthong United at the SCG Stadium on 3 February 2021.

Stadium and locations by season records

Season by season records

 P = Played
 W = Games won
 D = Games drawn
 L = Games lost
 F = Goals for
 A = Goals against
 Pts = Points
 Pos = Final position

T1 = Thai League 1

 QR1 = First Qualifying Round
 QR2 = Second Qualifying Round
 QR3 = Third Qualifying Round
 QR4 = Fourth Qualifying Round
 RInt = Intermediate Round
 R1 = Round 1
 R2 = Round 2
 R3 = Round 3

 R4 = Round 4
 R5 = Round 5
 R6 = Round 6
 GR = Group Stage
 QF = Quarter-finals
 SF = Semi-finals
 RU = Runners-up
 S = Shared
 W = Winners

Players

Current squad

Out on loan

Club Officials

Coaches
Coaches by years (2018–present)

References

External links
สมุทรปราการซิตี้ (SPC)

Thai League 1 clubs
Association football clubs established in 2018
Football clubs in Thailand
Sport in Samut Prakan province
2018 establishments in Thailand